Karin Kschwendt (born 14 September 1968) is a former professional tennis player who represented Luxembourg, Germany and Austria at various points in her career. She reached her career-high ranking of world No. 37 on 12 August 1996. In doubles, she went as high as No. 45 in February 1996.

Kschwendt was born in Switzerland to Austrian parents Heinz and Edith, but grew up in Luxembourg, where she lived for 23 years.

Tennis career
Kschwendt made her professional debut in 1986, when she played for Luxembourg during a Fed Cup tie. She continued to represent Luxembourg in the early part of her career, and in 1990 became the first female player from that country to reach the third round of a Grand Slam tournament, a feat that she achieved at Wimbledon, before she lost to Martina Navratilova.

In 1991, she reached the third round of the Australian Open, a result that broke her into the top 100, and finished the year at No. 88, but soon left in early 1992 after a lengthy break with injury. She came back stronger and managed to finish 1992 as the No. 78 in the world.

Kschwendt began to achieve solid results in 1993; now playing for Germany, she reached the semifinals of Auckland, the quarterfinals of Paris, and made her first and only WTA Tour final at an event in Belgium (she lost to Radka Bobková). The following year, she reached the third round of a major once more, this time at the French Open, but fell to Iva Majoli.

1996 saw Kschwendt put together her best season, reaching the third round of the Australian Open and achieving consistent results in WTA Tour events. She finished that year at No. 47, but went as high as No. 37 in August.

In 1997, she played her only match for the Austria Fed Cup team, losing her doubles match against Croatia.

Her last few years were mostly spent playing on the ITF Women's Circuit and qualifying rounds of WTA events. In 2000, she played her last match on the professional tour.

WTA career finals

Singles: 1 (runner-up)

Doubles: 8 (6 titles, 2 runner-ups)

ITF finals

Singles: 5 (2–3)

Doubles: 7 (3–4)

References

External links
 
 
 

1968 births
Living people
Austrian female tennis players
German female tennis players
German people of Austrian descent
Luxembourgian female tennis players
Luxembourgian people of Austrian descent
People from Sorengo